Heroina isonycterina, also known as the bujurqui, is a species of cichlid native to tropical Amazonian rivers of Colombia, Ecuador and Peru.

This species grows to a length of  SL.  This species is the only known member of its genus.

References

Heroini
Cichlid fish of South America
Freshwater fish of Colombia
Freshwater fish of Ecuador
Freshwater fish of Peru
Fish described in 1996
Taxa named by Sven O. Kullander